Phyllosticta nicotianae is a plant pathogen infecting tobacco.

References

External links
 USDA ARS Fungal Database

Fungal plant pathogens and diseases
Tobacco diseases
nicotiana